Quch-e Emam (also Romanized as Qūch-e Emām; also known as Qūch-e Emāmeh and Qūch-e Emāmī) is a village in Nur Ali Beyk Rural District, in the Central District of Saveh County, Markazi Province, Iran. At the 2006 census, its population was 116, in 30 families.

References 

Populated places in Saveh County